Scronkey is a small rural hamlet in the county of Lancashire, England. It is on the Over Wyre region of the Fylde, west of Garstang near Pilling.

The combined population of Scronkey and Eagland Hill was 272 in 2001.

References

Villages in Lancashire
Pilling
The Fylde